Waleed Mohyaden Ahmed (born 22 May 1982) is a Qatari football midfielder who played former Qatar in the 2004 AFC Asian Cup.

Mohyaden signed for Qatar Stars League side Umm Salal from Al Arabi in June 2012.

References

External links
 

1982 births
Living people
Qatari footballers
Qatar international footballers
Association football midfielders
Al-Arabi SC (Qatar) players
Umm Salal SC players
Al-Khor SC players
Al-Markhiya SC players
Al-Sailiya SC players
Al-Shamal SC players
Mesaimeer SC players
Qatar Stars League players
Qatari Second Division players